The 1992 Liga Semi-Pro Divisyen 2 season is the fourth season of Liga Semi-Pro Divisyen 2. A total of eight teams participated in the season.

Kedah and Kelantan were relegated from 1991 Liga Semi-Pro Divisyen 1.

Under the new format, only the top six teams in Divisyen 1 and the Divisyen 2 champions and runners-up will be involved in the Malaysia Cup. Malaysia Cup was played from the quarter-final stage, scheduled for November after the league was finished. The Malaysia Cup quarter-final and semi-final matches will be played on a home and away basis.

The season kicked off on 10 May 1992. Kedah ended up the season by winning the title. Kedah and Penang were automatically promoted to the first division alongside Kelantan which won the promotion play-off against Singapore.

Teams
Eight teams competing in the fourth season of Liga Semi-Pro Divisyen 2.

 Kedah (1992 Liga Semi-Pro Divisyen 2 champions) (Promoted to 1993 Liga Semi-Pro Divisyen 1)
 Penang (1992 Liga Semi-Pro Divisyen 2 promotion) (Promoted to 1993 Liga Semi-Pro Divisyen 1)
 Kelantan (1992 MSPFL promotion play-off) (Promoted to 1993 Liga Semi-Pro Divisyen 1)
 Police
 Perlis
 Air Forces
 Brunei
 Malacca

League table

Champions

References

Liga Semi-Pro Divisyen 2 seasons
2
Malaysia